Sonia Sui is a Taiwanese actress, television host and model. She is best known for her role as Hsieh An-chen in the 2010 television series The Fierce Wife.

Life and career
At the age of 13, Sui was sent to Poland, where she completed her junior high school education in Poznań. She then moved to Winnipeg, Manitoba, Canada where she finished her high school and went to study psychology at University of Winnipeg. Upon completion of the program, Sonia moved back to Taipei and started to pursue a modeling career.

In recent years, Sui has successfully turned to acting and hosting television shows. She starred in a number of television series and films, including the well-received Magicians of Love and The Year of Happiness and Love, as well as earning many endorsement deals. Sui was also the co-host of the Golden Horse Awards ceremony in 2008.

In 2018 she founded her own clothing brand SuiTangTang. In September, 2018 she announced her third baby Olie.

Personal life 
Sui was in a relationship with How Yao from 2004 to 2012; she then married Tony Hsieh in 2015. She gave birth to a son, Max, on August 30, 2015. Their second child, a daughter named Lucy, was born on February 1, 2017. Their third child was born on December 18, 2018, named Olie.

Filmography

Film

Television series

Variety show

Music video

Published works

Awards and nominations

References

External links 

 
 

People from Nantou County
Taiwanese female models
University of Winnipeg alumni
21st-century Taiwanese actresses
Taiwanese film actresses
Taiwanese television actresses
Taiwanese television presenters
Living people
1980 births
Taiwanese women television presenters